William Speed Lane Fox-Pitt  (born 2 January 1969) is an English equestrian who competes in eventing. His career highlights include winning three Olympic medals in the team event, with silver in 2004 and 2012, and bronze in 2008. At the World Equestrian Games, he won team gold and individual silver in 2010, and team silver and individual bronze in 2014. He also won World team medals in 2002 and 2006. At the European Championships, he has won six team gold medals, as well as Individual silver in 1997 and 2005, and Individual bronze in 2013. He is the recordman CCI*****'s winner with 14 grand slam titles. In 2011, he became the first rider to win five different five-star events, having won the Burghley Horse Trials a record six times (1994, 2002, 2005, 2007, 2008 and 2011), Rolex Kentucky three times (2010, 2012, 2014), Stars of Pau twice (2011, 2013), the Badminton Horse Trials twice (2004, 2015), and the Luhmühlen Horse Trials once (2008). A serious fall in 2015 left him in a coma for two weeks, but he came back to make the British eventing team and attend the 2016 Summer Olympics. He was appointed Member of the Order of the British Empire (MBE) in the 2018 Birthday Honours.

Family background and education
Fox-Pitt was born in Hampstead, the eldest son of William Oliver Lane Fox-Pitt (1932-2012, known as Oliver) and Marietta Speed. His father competed in many sports, and in addition had a career in the city, founding an investment bank now known as Fox-Pitt Kelton Cochran Caronia Waller. Oliver and Marietta were both equestrian competitors, riding at Badminton and Burghley, and his siblings have been very successful as well. His paternal grandfather was Major-General "Billy" Fox-Pitt  a Dorset landowner who served in both World Wars and was a founding officer of the Welsh Guards.

Fox-Pitt was educated at Wellesley House School in Kent, Eton College and the Goldsmiths, University of London.

Fox-Pitt began riding at age four. At 13, he stopped riding because he feared he would be bullied by his peers. With the encouragement of his parents, Fox-Pitt began his outstanding career in eventing at the age of 15.

He is married to former eventer and current ITV Racing presenter Alice Plunkett. They have four children: Oliver, Thomas, Chloe, and Emily.

Sporting career
He is the recordman CCI*****'s winner with 14 titles. He is also the only rider to won 5 out of the six CCI*****'s 
having won Burghley (1994, 2002, 2005, 2007, 2008, 2011), Badminton (2004 & 2015), Pau (2011, 2013), Kentucky (2010, 2012, 2014) and Luhmuhlen (2008).
He holds the record for the most wins (six) at the Burghley Horse Trials; William's victories coming in 1994, 2002, 2005, 2007, 2008 and 2011. Additional major wins have been at the Badminton Horse Trials in 2004 and again in 2015, at Gatcombe Park in 1995, 2000, 2003 and 2005.
Team golds in European Championships in 1995, 1997, 2001, 2003, 2005, 2009.  He took individual silver at the 1997 Europeans, team bronze at the 2002 and 2011 Europeans, individual silver at the 2005 Europeans, team silver at the 2006 Aachen World Equestrian Games, team gold at the 2010 World Equestrian Games, individual bronze at the 2013 Europeans, team silver and individual bronze at the 2014 World Equestrian Games, and team silver at the 2015 Europeans. He also represented Great Britain at the (1996 Summer Olympics/Atlanta), (2004 Summer Olympics/Athens), (2008 Summer Olympics/Beijing), (2012 Summer Olympics/London) and (2016 Summer Olympics/Rio), winning team silver in Athens, team bronze in Beijing and team silver in London.  In 2006 he was ranked the leading rider in Britain for the sixth year running and 2nd in the world, and as of 2014 he was ranked 1st in the world.  William is married to Channel 4 Racing presenter Alice Plunkett. They have two sons; Oliver (born in August 2005) and Thomas (born 15 November 2006), and two daughters; Chloe (born October 2012) and Emily (born September 2014). William is a regular columnist in the weekly equestrian magazine, Horse & Hound.

In the eventing world, one of his best known partnerships is with the horse Tamarillo.

In October 2015, a fall at a competition in France left him in a coma for two weeks.  After regaining consciousness, he had initial trouble with blindness and then double vision, but was ultimately able to earn a spot on the British team for the 2016 Olympics and returned to international competition with the stallion Chilli Morning. He was the only remaining member of the team who won silver in London 2012.

Career highlights

2019
1st Tattersalls Horse Trials CCI*** (Georgisaurous)
2nd Festival of British Eventing Novice Championships (Grafennacht)

2018
2nd Blenheim Palace Horse Trials CCI*** (Oratorio II)
2nd Tattersalls Horse Trials CCI*** (Little Fire)

2017
1st Barbury Horse Trials CIC*** (Clifton Signature)

2016
12th Individual at the Summer Olympics in Rio (Chilli Morning)

2015
 Team Silver at the European Championships in Scotland (Bay My Hero)
1st Badminton Horse Trials CCI**** (Chilli Morning)
4th Rolex Kentucky Three Day CCI**** (Bay My Hero)

2014
FEI World number 1 eventing rider
 Individual Bronze and Team Silver at the World Equestrian Games in France (Chilli Morning)
1st Rolex Kentucky Three Day CCI**** (Bay My Hero) 
9th Rolex Kentucky Three Day CCI**** (Seacookie)

2013
1st Stars of Pau CCI **** (Seacookie)
3rd Stars of Pau CCI **** (Cool Mountain)
 Individual Bronze at the European Championship in Sweden (Chilli Morning)
3rd Luhmühlen Horse Trials CCI **** (Neuf des Coeurs)
4th Luhmühlen Horse Trials CCI **** (Lionheart)
1st Bramham Horse Trials CCI***(Chilli Morning)
5th Badminton Horse Trials CCI **** (Parklane Hawk)
2nd Rolex Kentucky Three Day CCI **** (Seacookie)

2012
FEI World number 1 eventing rider
1st Bramham Horse Trials CCI***(Chilli Morning)
1st Rolex Kentucky Three Day CCI **** (Parklane Hawk)
Team Silver at the Summer Olympics in London (Lionheart)

2011
 Team Bronze at the European Championships in Luhmuhlen (Cool Mountain)
1st Burghley Horse Trials CCI **** (Parklane Hawk)
1st Stars of Pau CCI **** (Oslo)

2010
FEI World number 1 eventing rider
1st Rolex Kentucky Three Day CCI **** (Cool Mountain)
 Team Gold and Individual Silver at FEI World Equestrian Games Kentucky (Cool Mountain)

2009
 Team Gold at the European Championships in France (Idalgo)

2008
FEI World number 1 eventing rider
1st Burghley Horse Trials CCI **** (Tamarillo)
2nd Burghley Horse Trials CCI **** (Ballincoola)
3rd Badminton Horse Trials CCI **** (Ballincoola)
1st Bramham Horse Trials CCI*** (Navigator)
1st Luhmühlen Horse Trials CCI **** (Macchiato)
Team Bronze at the Summer Olympics in Beijing

2007
1st Bramham Horse Trials CCI*** (Macchiato)
1st Burghley Horse Trials CCI **** (Parkmore Ed)
1st Blair CCI*** (Macchiato)
5th Burghley Horse Trials CCI **** (Ballincoola)

2006
9th Badminton Horse Trials CCI **** (Ballincoola)
11th Luhmühlen Horse Trials CCI **** (Birthday Night)
1st Hartpary CCI*** (Moon Man)
15th Aachen WEG **** (Tamarillo)
3rd Blenheim Horse Trials CCI*** (Parkmore Ed)
6th Burghley Horse Trials CCI **** (Ballincoola)

2005
1st Burghley Horse Trials CCI **** (Ballincoola)
1st Boekelo Horse Trials CCI*** (Mr. Dumbledore)
2nd Badminton Horse Trials CCI **** (Tamarillo)
1st Bramham Horse Trials CCI*** (Mr. Dumbledore)
2nd Bramham Horse Trials CCI*** (Idalgo)
1st Gatcombe British Open (Moon Man)
Team gold and individual silver at the European Championships (Tamarillo)
Winner of the British Eventing Premier League

2004
1st Badminton Horse Trials CCI **** (Tamarillo)
4th Rolex Kentucky Three Day CCI **** (Ballincoola)
7th Fontainebleau (Stunning)
Team silver at the Athens Olympics (Tamarillo)

2003
5th Le Lion d’Angers (Idalgo)
8th Le Lion d’Angers (Igor de Cluis)
1st Boekelo (Tom Cruise)
Team gold and 8th individual European Championships, Punchestown, Ireland (Moon Man)
1st CIC World Cup Qualifier, Thirlestane Castle (Stunning)
1st British Open Championships, Gatcombe Park (Stunning)
2nd British Open Championships, Gatcombe Park (Moon Man)
1st British Intermediate Championships, Gatcombe Park (Tom Cruise II)
1st Luhmühlen Horse Trials CIC *** (Tom Cruise II)
1st Bramham Horse Trials CCI *** (Wallow)
2nd Bramham Horse Trials CCI *** (Ballincoola)
7th Saumur (Coastal Ties)
1st Chatsworth CIC World Cup Qualifier (Stunning)
3rd Rolex Kentucky Three Day CCI **** (Moon Man)

2002
FEI World number 1 eventing rider
Team bronze World Equestrian Games, Jerez, Spain (Tamarillo)
1st Burghley Horse Trials CCI **** (Highland Lad)
7th Burghley Horse Trials CCI **** (Moon Man)
4th Boekelo (Stunning)
3rd British Open Championships, Gatcombe Park (Moon Man)
4th British Open Championships, Gatcombe Park (Stunning)
4th Rolex Kentucky Three Day CCI **** (Stunning)
2nd Badminton Horse Trials CCI **** (Tamarillo)
6th Bramham Horse Trials CCI *** (Highland Lad)
8th Bramham Horse Trials CCI *** (Just A Sovereign)

2001
5th and Team gold European Champs, Pau, France (Stunning)
4th Bonn Roderberg CCIO (Barclay Square)
4th Saumur (Stunning)
9th Burghley Horse Trials CCI **** (Springleaze Macaroo)

2000
1st British Open Champs, Gatcombe Park (Moon Man)
1st Blenheim Horse Trials CCI *** (Stunning)
2nd Blenheim Horse Trials CCI *** (Tamarillo)

1999
2nd Achselschwang (Moon Man)
7th Bramham Horse Trials CCI *** (Moon Man)

1997
Individual silver and Team gold European Open Championships, Burghley (Cosmopolitan II)
2nd Scottish Open Championships, Thirlestane Castle (Cosmopolitan II)
3rd Badminton Horse Trials CCI **** (Cosmopolitan II)

1996
5th Olympic Games Team Competition, Atlanta, USA (Cosmopolitan II)
6th Bramham Horse Trials CCI *** (Lismore Lord Charles)
5th Boekelo (Mostly Mischief)

1995
6th and Team gold European Open Championships, Pratoni del Vivaro, Italy (Cosmopolitan II)
1st Bramham Horse Trials CCI *** (Cosmopolitan II)
1st British Open Championships, Gatcombe Park (Chaka)
6th Blenheim Horse Trials CCI *** (Loch Alan)
5th Boekelo (Faerie Diadem)

1994
1st Burghley Horse Trials CCI **** (Chaka)
2nd Scottish Open Championships, Thirlestane Castle (Chaka)
7th Punchestown (Thomastown)
2nd British Open Championships, Gatcombe Park (Chaka)

1993
7th Badminton Horse Trials CCI **** (Chaka)

1990

4th and Team gold Young Rider European Championships (Steadfast)
3rd Young Rider National Championships (Faerie Sovereign)

1989

Individual bronze and Team silver Young Rider European Championships, Achselschwang, Germany

1988

4th and Team gold Young Rider European Championships, Zonhoven, Belgium (Steadfast)

1987

Individual silver Junior European Championships, Pratoni del Vivaro, Italy (Steadfast)
5th Junior National Championships

1985

8th Junior National Championships 1985

Partial CCI5* Results

International Championship results

Gallery

References

External links

 William Fox-Pitt Official Website

British event riders
People educated at Eton College
Alumni of Goldsmiths, University of London
1969 births
Living people
Olympic bronze medallists for Great Britain
Olympic silver medallists for Great Britain
Equestrians at the 1996 Summer Olympics
Equestrians at the 2004 Summer Olympics
Equestrians at the 2008 Summer Olympics
Equestrians at the 2012 Summer Olympics
Equestrians at the 2016 Summer Olympics
Olympic equestrians of Great Britain
British male equestrians
Olympic medalists in equestrian
Medalists at the 2012 Summer Olympics
Medalists at the 2008 Summer Olympics
Medalists at the 2004 Summer Olympics
Members of the Order of the British Empire